Bieganów may refer to the following places in Poland:
Bieganów, Lower Silesian Voivodeship (south-west Poland)
Bieganów, Świętokrzyskie Voivodeship (south-central Poland)
Bieganów, Masovian Voivodeship (east-central Poland)
Bieganów, Lubusz Voivodeship (west Poland)